Mauidrillia is a genus of sea snails, marine gastropod mollusks in the family Horaiclavidae, the turrids.

Species
Species within the genus Mauidrillia include:

A.W.B. Powell (1944) mentions also a number of Australian species from the Lower Miocene to Recent
 † Mauidrillia acuta (Marwick, 1928) 
 † Mauidrillia angustata Powell, 1942 
 † Mauidrillia browni Marwick, 1943 
 † Mauidrillia cinctuta (Marwick, 1929) 
 † Mauidrillia clavicula Powell, 1942 
 † Mauidrillia consutilis (Tenison-Woods, 1880)
 † Mauidrillia costifer (Suter, 1917) 
 Mauidrillia felina Kilburn, 1988
 † Mauidrillia fimbriata Laws, 1947 
 † Mauidrillia imparilirata Powell, 1942 
 † Mauidrillia inaequalis Powell, 1942 
 † Mauidrillia incerta Beu, 1970 
 † Mauidrillia occidentalis Maxwell, 1988 
 † Mauidrillia praecophinodes (Suter, 1917) 
 † Mauidrillia supralaevis Powell, 1942 
 † Mauidrillia unilirata Powell, 1942

References

 Powell, A.W.B. 1942: The New Zealand Recent and fossil Mollusca of the family Turridae. Bulletin of the Auckland Institute and Museum 2: 188 p
 P. A. Maxwell. 1988. Late Miocene Deep-Water Mollusca from the Stillwater Mudstone at Greymouth, Westland, New Zealand: Paleoecology and Systematics. New Zealand Geological Survey Paleontological Bulletin 55

External links
 Marwick, J. "Transactions and Proceedings of the Royal Society of New Zealand 1868-1961." Proc. US Nat. Mus 45 (1913): 235.
 Marwick, J. "The Tertiary Mollusca of the Chatham Islands including a generic revision of the New Zealand Pectinidae." Transactions of the New Zealand institute. Vol. 58. No. 4. 1928
  Marwick, J. Some Tertiary Mollusca from North Otago. publisher not identified, 1943
 Beu, A. G. "Marine Mollusca of the last 2 million years in New Zealand. Part 5. Summary." Journal of the Royal Society of New Zealand 42.1 (2012): 1-47

 
Horaiclavidae
Gastropod genera